JSC Zelenodolsk Shipyard is a shipbuilding company based in Zelenodolsk, Russia. It is part of the Ak Bars Holding.

History
Zelenodolsk Plant became an important military shipbuilder when equipment was evacuated there from the western USSR early in World War II and the yard began building Artillerist-class submarine chasers.

After the war, the shipyard specialized in building submarine chaser and small escort ship classes designed by its collocated design bureau, including the Kronshtadt, SO-1, Poti, and Grisha classes. Following expansion of the yard in the early 1970s, Zelenodolsk Plant produced the larger escorts of the Koni class, which was intended exclusively for export. The Koni class was succeeded by the Gepard class.

Zelenodolsk Plant also built the large missile-armed surface effect ships of the Dergach class (designed by the Almaz Central Marine Design Bureau in St. Petersburg), as well as some naval auxiliaries. It has generally also had at least one civilian ship type in production, including Zelenodolsk-class river tugs in the 1950s, Meteor-type passenger hydrofoils (designed in Nizhniy Novgorod) and Caspian Sea trawlers during the 1960s, and 3,700-ton Tatarstan-class refrigerator ships for the fishing industry in the 1970s.

References

External links
 

Shipbuilding companies of Russia
Companies based in Tatarstan
Shipbuilding companies of the Soviet Union
Ministry of the Shipbuilding Industry (Soviet Union)